Sandro Stringari is an Italian theoretical physicist, who has contributed to the theory of quantum many-body physics, including atomic nuclei, quantum liquids and ultra-cold atomic Bose and Fermi gases. He has developed in a systematic way the sum rule approach to the collective behavior of interacting systems.

Biography
After the studies at the University of Pisa and at the Scuola Normale Superiore  Pisa, completed in 1972  and supervised by Bruno Touschek,  he moved to Trento and Oxford  under the supervision of Renzo Leonardi and David Brink, respectively. In the years 1978/79 and 1985/86, invited by Oriol Bohigas Marti, he has worked at the Institut de Physique Nucleaire in Orsay.    In 1990 he became full professor at the University of Trento, where he currently teaches an undergraduate course on quantum mechanics and a graduate course on quantum gases and superfluidity.  In 2002 he established in Trento the Center on Bose –Einstein Condensation (BEC Center), founded by the Istituto Nazionale per la Fisica della Materia (INFM), and now part of CNR. In the year 2004/2005, invited by Claude Cohen-Tannoudji,  he held the European Chair at the Collège de France, in Paris. In 2010 he was recipient of the 5 years ERC Advanced Grant “Quantum Gases beyond equilibrium”. Since 2011 he is corresponding member of the Accademia Nazionale dei Lincei.

Main scientific contributions
In the first period of his scientific career Sandro Stringari focused on the   magnetic properties of atomic nuclei and on the isospin degree of freedom, developing the innovative sum rule approach to the collective excitations.

Starting from the 80’s he oriented his interests in the direction of atomic clusters and quantum liquids. Major contributions of this period are the study of  the evaporation mechanism of helium clusters  and the  T=0 extension of the Hohenberg-Mermin-Wagner theorem.

His interests in the physics of Bose-Einstein condensates (BEC) started with the workshop on Bose-Einstein Condensation (BEC), known as the “Levico conference”, organized in 1993 at Levico. After the first experimental realization of BEC in 1995, he developed the formalism of superfluid hydrodynamics to describe the collective oscillations of a harmonically trapped BECs, providing analytic predictions for their frequencies.  This contribution had a major impact on the first generation of experiments on ultra cold quantum gases and influenced an important line of theoretical  work.  Later contributions to the dynamics of trapped quantum gases, and to their rotational, superfluid and thermodynamic properties are summarized in the review papers  on Bose-Einstein condensates  and Fermi gases  as well as in the book on Bose-Einstein Condensation and Superfluidity  written in collaboration with Lev Pitaevskii.   For a   complete description of his main   scientific achievements see  bec.science.unitn.it

References                                                                 

Condensed matter physicists
Italian nuclear physicists
1949 births
Living people